The historic composition of the Senate of the Netherlands gives an overview of the composition of the upper house of the Dutch parliament (in Dutch: Eerste Kamer, First Chamber). It shows the composition after the indirect elections by the States-Provincial.

* Since 1956 the Senate has had 75 seats.

See also 
 List of cabinets of the Netherlands
 List of prime ministers of the Netherlands
 Historic composition of the House of Representatives

References 
  Historic composition of the Senate 1946-2007 at Parlement.com
  Senate elections 1983-2019 at Parlement.com
 Corresponding article on the Dutch Wikipedia

Senate (Netherlands)
 
Netherlands politics-related lists